Cairon is a commune in the Calvados department in the Normandy region in northwestern France.

Geography
The commune of Cairon is situated in Normandy, in Calvados, 5 kilometers to the north-west of Caen.

The Mue river and its tributary the Vey flow through Cairon.

Toponymy
Cairon, Karon in 1077 and Cayron in 1231: the toponym was probably formed from the Gallo-Roman Carius by adding the suffix -onis.

History
During the Invasion of Normandy, Cairon was liberated on June 11, 1944, by the 46th Royal Marine Commando.

The demonym (previously gentilic) is Caironnais.

Population
In 2015, the commune totaled 1,947 inhabitants, a growth of 21% compared to 2010 (Calvados: +1.53%, France outside Mayotte: +2.44%).

See also
Communes of the Calvados department
Buron
Jean-Luc Cairon (born 1962), French gymnast and coach

References

Calvados communes articles needing translation from French Wikipedia
Communes of Calvados (department)